The Calouste Gulbenkian Foundation, commonly referred to simply as the Gulbenkian Foundation, is a Portuguese institution dedicated to the promotion of the arts, philanthropy, science, and education. One of the wealthiest charitable foundations in the world, the Gulbenkian Foundation was founded on 18 July 1956 according to the last will and testament of Calouste Sarkis Gulbenkian, a Portugal-based oil magnate who bequeathed his assets to the country in the form of a foundation.

Gulbenkian the Armenian oil magnate had one of the largest private art collections in Europe, which is housed in the foundation's Calouste Gulbenkian Museum in Lisbon. The foundation hosts numerous institutions and initiatives including the Gulbenkian Orchestra, Gulbenkian Science Institute, Gulbenkian Prizes and the Gulbenkian Commission.

Organization

Located in Lisbon (civil parish of Avenidas Novas), the Foundation's premises opened in 1969 and were designed by Ruy Athouguia, Pedro Cid, and Alberto Pessoa. In addition to Foundation offices, the complex includes an auditorium, exhibition space, congress facilities, and a large building designed specifically to house and display Museum and art library. These are set in Gulbenkian Park, which was designed by Ribeiro Telles. In 1983, the Modern Art Centre was added at one end of the park.

Calouste Gulbenkian Museum

The Calouste Gulbenkian Museum, founded in conformity with his last will and testament, accommodates his collection of mostly ancient and classical art, but including some individual modern pieces.

Instituto Gulbenkian de Ciência

The Instituto Gulbenkian de Ciência (IGC, a science institute) is not situated on the same premises but its own complex in Oeiras (outskirts of Lisbon), near the palace of the Marquis of Pombal. The institute is an international centre for biological and biomedical research and graduate training. Founded in 1961, the IGC is organised in small independent research groups that work in an environment designed to encourage interactions with minimal hierarchical structure. The scientific programme is multidisciplinary, including Cell and Developmental biology, Evolutionary biology, Immunology, Host-pathogen interaction, Disease Genetics, Plant Biology, Neurosciences, Theoretical and Computational biology.

Gulbenkian Orchestra

The Gulbenkian Orchestra is a Portuguese symphony orchestra based in Lisbon. The orchestra primarily gives concerts at the 1,228-seat Grande Auditório (Grand Auditorium) of the Foundation's main premises. Established in 1962 as the Orquestra de Câmara Gulbenkian (Gulbenkian Chamber Orchestra) with 12 musicians, it has subsequently expanded in size and took on its current name in 1971.

Gulbenkian Ballet
Gulbenkian ballet was a Portuguese classical dance troupe created in 1965 by the Foundation as Centro Português do Bailado. Its programme directors were Walter Gore (1965–1969), Milko Sparembeck (1969–1975), Jorge Salavisa (1977–1996), Iracity Cardoso (1996–2003) and Paulo Ribeiro (2003–2005). The project was terminated in 2005.

Gulbenkian Choir
Gulbenkian Choir (Portuguese: Coro Gulbenkian) is a musical choir project established by the Foundation in 1964 as the Gulbenkian Chamber Choir (Coro de Câmara Gulbenkian) directed by Olga Violante (1964–1969). Since then the choir made up of an average 100 members is directed by Michel Corboz.

Branches
The Calouste Gulbenkian Foundation also has a delegation in the United Kingdom (UK Branch) and a centre in Paris (the Calouste Gulbenkian Cultural Centre). The Foundation's Armenian Communities Department has a unique and separate long-running mission in aiding Armenia and Diasporan Armenian projects. It is a member of the Network of European Foundations for Innovative Cooperation (NEF).  The mission statement of the UK Branch desires to change perceptions, build relationships, reduce social exclusion and preserve the environment and innovative partnerships.

Publishing

The foundation publishes books on a range of topics, including arts, education and languages.

Partex
Partex, a Portuguese oil extraction company, was fully owned by the Calouste Gulbenkian Foundation until it was sold in June 2019 to a Thai company.

Gulbenkian Foundation in the Armenian communities
The Calouste Gulbenkian Foundation is very active in the Armenian community worldwide as its founder Calouste Gulbenkian was of Armenian ethnicity. The Foundation has its Armenian Communities Department headed by Razmik Panossian. The Foundation's Armenian Communities Department distributes scholarships in the form of grants and bourses to Armenian students worldwide pursuing their education all over the world. The Foundation is active in Armenia and throughout the Armenian diaspora. It also supports actively in promotion and preservation of the Armenian language, in particular Western Armenian used mostly by the Armenian diaspora, support of Armenian schools throughout the world, as well as Armenian societies, history, culture, churches, media, sports etc.

Gulbenkian Commission

The Gulbenkian Commission sought to address inadequacies in the organization of the social science disciplines that developed in the nineteenth century by indicating a direction for social scientific inquiry for the next 50 years. It was founded by the Calouste Gulbenkian Foundation. It held three meetings in 1994 and 1995.

Honours
 Grand-Cross of the Order of Merit, Portugal (20 June 1960)
 Honorary Member of the Military Order of Saint James of the Sword, Portugal (7 August 1981)
 Honorary Member of the Order of Prince Henry, Portugal (13 August 1986)
 Honorary Member of the Order of Liberty, Portugal (20 July 2016)

See also
 List of wealthiest charitable foundations
Centro de Arte Moderna Gulbenkian
 Museu Calouste Gulbenkian
 Gulbenkian commission
 Gulbenkian Orchestra
 Gulbenkian Science Institute
 Museum of the Year, formerly the Gulbenkian Prize

References

External links

 Calouste Gulbenkian Foundation website
 Instituto Gulbenkian Ciência 
 La Fondation Gulbenkian à Paris 
 Gulbenkian Foundation UK Branch
 Calouste Gulbenkian Foundation 3D Model
 "Open the Social Sciences" in High Beam Encyclopedia  l
 "Open the Social Sciences: To Whom and For What?" by Michael Buroway (address delivered to Portuguese Sociological Association, 30 March 2006). 
 "Gulbenkian Commission on the Restructuring of the Social Sciences, Description of Project" on the website of the Fernand Braudel Center  

 
Arts in Portugal